Timothy Philip Don (born 14 January 1978 in Isleworth, London) is a triathlete from the United Kingdom.

Career
Don is the son of former Premier League referee Philip Don. He competed in the London Youth Games where he represented Hounslow in the triathlon. He competed at the first Olympic triathlon at the 2000 Summer Olympics. He took tenth place with a total time of 1hr 49min 28.85sec.

In the second Olympic triathlon at the 2004 Summer Olympics he was placed eighteenth with a total time of 1hr 54min 42.13sec. Don was controversially selected for the 2008 Beijing Olympics despite serving a ban for missed out of competition drug tests. At the Beijing Olympics Don failed to finish after exiting the swim in 48th place (out of 55) and was pulled out of the race by officials for being too far behind on the bike leg. The British team later admitted that he was ill prior to the Beijing race.

On 3 September 2006 in Lausanne Don became World Champion after finishing 17 seconds in front of Hamish Carter. Following the swim, he was in the lead group on the bike but missed the initial break. He bridged the gap alone and caught the lead group on lap 5 out of 6, then took the lead along with Carter on the run, breaking clear about halfway through.

However his performance was overshadowed by a three-month ban a few weeks later for missing three out of competition drug tests within an 18-month period prior to the race. The ban expired on 25 December 2006, but a byelaw meant that Don remained ineligible for Olympic selection. On Friday, 25 May 2007, Don was cleared by the British Olympic Association for selection for future Olympic Games after appealing against a ban for missing doping tests. The BOA appeals panel whilst clearing Don to compete in future Olympic Games criticised him for being "indisputably careless and irresponsible".

Don won the 2007 London Triathlon in a time of 1 hour 42 minutes 1 second on 5 August 2007. He set a new Ironman World Record with 7:40:23 at Ironman South American Championship in Florianopolis, Brazil on 28 May 2017

Two days before the 2017 Ironman World Championships, Tim Don was hit by a car whilst riding along the Queen K highway near Kona International Airport in Hawaii. He suffered a Hangman's fracture to his neck. He spent 3 months recovering in a Halo Brace. Six months after he was injured, he returned to compete in the 2018 Boston Marathon where he finished in a time of 2:49:42.

References

External links
 British Triathlon Federation athlete profile
 British Olympic Association athlete profile
 Domestic Racing Profile

1978 births
Living people
English male triathletes
Doping cases in triathlon
English sportspeople in doping cases
Olympic triathletes of Great Britain
Triathletes at the 2000 Summer Olympics
Triathletes at the 2004 Summer Olympics
Triathletes at the 2008 Summer Olympics
People from Hounslow
Duathletes
Triathletes at the 2006 Commonwealth Games
Commonwealth Games competitors for England
Athletes from London